Anelosimus bali is a species of spider found in Bali, Indonesia, after which the species is named. It is a coastal species, found in small-leaved mangrove trees along the beach. No male specimens have been identified, and the social structure of the species is not known. It was first identified in 2012 by Ingi Agnarsson.

References

Theridiidae
Spiders of Oceania
Spiders described in 2012